Jacqueline André (born Bonnet on 29 August 1946) is a retired French hurdler. She competed in the 100 m event at the 1972 Summer Olympics, but failed to reach the final.

Biography  
André won three French Championships: one outdoors, in the 100 m hurdles in 1972, and two indoors, in the 50 m hurdles (1972) and 60 m hurdles (1973). She bettered five times the French record of the 100 meters hurdles, bringing it to 13.30 in 1972.

Prize list  
 French Outdoors Athletic Championships:  
 winner of the 100m hurdles in 1972   
 French Indoors Athletics Championships:  
 winner of 50 m hurdles 1972   
 winner of the 60m hurdles in 1973

References  

1946 births
Living people
French female hurdlers
Athletes (track and field) at the 1972 Summer Olympics
Olympic athletes of France
Sportspeople from Nantes